Gheorghe Sima (born 1952) is a Moldovan politician. He served as the Minister of Education (26 February 2002 - 2 July 2003).

In 1998, Gheorghe Sima and his group left the Social Democratic Party. On September 25, 1999, he formed the Labour Party (Moldova).

References

External links 
 What’s happening with Social Democratic Party of Moldova?

Living people
Moldovan Ministers of Education
Year of birth missing (living people)